Claire McNab (born 1940 in Melbourne, Australia) is the pseudonym of Claire Carmichael, an Australian writer. While pursuing a career as a high school teacher in Sydney, she began her writing career with comedy plays and textbooks. She left teaching in the mid-1980s to become a full-time writer. In her native Australia she is known for her self-help and children's books.

She is best known for 14 crime novels featuring the highly popular Detective-Inspector Carol Ashton and six featuring undercover agent Denise Cleever. Her latest series features Kylie Kendall, an Australian transplanted to Los Angeles, who determines to become a private investigator in order to pursue her father's business and his business partner.

McNab has served as the president of Sisters in Crime and is a member of both the Mystery Writers of America and the Science Fiction Writers of America.  She is a 2006 Medal Winner of the Alice B. Awards and was nominated for the 1996 Lammy Award Lesbian Mystery Award.

She moved to Los Angeles in 1994 after falling in love with an American woman, and now teaches not-yet-published writers through the UCLA Writers' Extension Program.

In addition to crime fiction, McNab has published children's novels, picture books, self-help, and English textbooks.

She returns to Australia at least once a year to refresh her aussie accent.

Works

See also

 Lesbian literature
 List of mystery writers
 List of female detective/mystery writers
 List of female detective characters
 Detective fiction
 Crime fiction

References

External links
 Fantastic Fiction: Claire McNab 
 Claire McNab's own site 
 Sisters in Crime
 Sisters in Crime/Los Angeles Chapter
 Mystery Writers of America
 UCLA Extension Writers' Program 
 Bella Books

American women novelists
20th-century Australian novelists
21st-century Australian novelists
Australian non-fiction writers
Australian women novelists
1940 births
Living people
20th-century American novelists
American LGBT novelists
20th-century American women writers
Women mystery writers
21st-century American women writers
Australian emigrants to the United States
20th-century Australian women writers
Lesbian novelists
Australian LGBT novelists
21st-century American LGBT people
Australian crime fiction writers
American lesbian writers
20th-century Australian LGBT people